Vincenzo Zazzaro (2 January 1951 – 12 November 2019) was an Italian former professional footballer who played as a midfielder. He was born in Quarto. He played 11 games in Serie A and 5 in the UEFA Cup for A.C. Milan in the 1971–72 season. He represented Italy at under-21 level.

References

1951 births
2019 deaths
Footballers from Naples
Association football midfielders
Italian footballers
Italy under-21 international footballers
A.C. Milan players
Calcio Lecco 1912 players
Reggina 1914 players
S.S. Arezzo players
U.S. Salernitana 1919 players
S.S. Turris Calcio players
Serie A players
Serie B players